Dennis Posa (October 28, 1946 – January 28, 1985), also known by the performing names of Wade Nichols and Dennis Parker, was an actor and singer who started his career in adult films.

Early life 
Parker was born in Manhattan, New York and raised in Freeport, New York. He attended the Philadelphia Museum College of Art, studying furniture design. During his stint at PMCA, he won a role in a touring company production of The Trojan Women. He later attended New York University and the Herbert Berghof Studio, where he studied acting. He supported himself by working as a carpenter for several years.

Career
Parker's first feature film role was in the gay adult film Boy 'Napped (1975). He subsequently appeared mostly in straight porn films shot in New York, such as Summer of Laura (1975), Jail Bait (1976), Barbara Broadcast (1977), Teenage Pajama Party (1977), Maraschino Cherry (1977), Punk Rock (1977), Take Off (1978) and Blonde Ambition (1981). Parker was credited as Wade Nichols in most of the adult films in which he appeared.

In 1979, using the name Dennis Parker, he recorded a disco album on Casablanca Records, titled Like an Eagle. The album was produced by Village People creator and producer Jacques Morali, who was Parker's boyfriend at the time. He also toured Europe to promote the album. He later appeared in the French film Monique that same year, with "Like an Eagle" being used as its theme song. The title track was released as a single and appears on the box set The Casablanca Records Story (1994). "New York By Night", another song recorded as Dennis Parker, peaked at No. 11 on the South African music charts in 1980.

Parker joined the cast of the soap opera The Edge of Night in 1979 as Police Chief Derek Mallory. He continued in the role until 1984. Seriously ill by October of that year, Parker was unable to continue working on the show, and his character was written out.

Death
Parker died on January 28, 1985. In a tribute to Parker in a 1985 issue of Soap Opera Digest, fellow Edge of Night actor Ernie Townsend wrote, "He died in early January after a long and painful illness that took away a talent in its prime." An obituary released in Virginia stated that he died after a "brief illness, survived by his mother, brother, and partner." It was revealed later that he died of an unspecified AIDS-related illness.

Partial filmography

References

External links 
 
 
 
 Wade Nichols: 'A Galaxy of Pleasure and Pain' His Untold Story, profile of Wade Nichols, The Rialto Report, June 25, 2017

American male pornographic film actors
American actors in gay pornographic films
American male soap opera actors
Gay pornographic film actors
1946 births
1985 deaths
AIDS-related deaths in New York (state)
20th-century American male actors
20th-century American LGBT people